The progesterone receptor (PR), also known as NR3C3 or nuclear receptor subfamily 3, group C, member 3, is a protein found inside cells. It is activated by the steroid hormone progesterone.

In humans, PR is encoded by a single PGR gene residing on chromosome 11q22, it has two isoforms, PR-A and PR-B, that differ in their molecular weight. The PR-B is the positive regulator of the effects of progesterone, while PR-A serve to antagonize the effects of PR-B.

Mechanism 
Progesterone is necessary to induce the progesterone receptors. When no binding hormone is present the carboxyl terminal inhibits transcription. Binding to a hormone induces a structural change that removes the inhibitory action. Progesterone antagonists prevent the structural reconfiguration.

After progesterone binds to the receptor, restructuring with dimerization follows and the complex enters the nucleus and binds to DNA. There transcription takes place, resulting in formation of messenger RNA that is translated by ribosomes to produce specific proteins.

Structure

In common with other steroid receptors, the progesterone receptor has a N-terminal regulatory domain, a DNA binding domain, a hinge section, and a C-terminal ligand binding domain. A special transcription activation function (TAF), called TAF-3, is present in the progesterone receptor-B, in a B-upstream segment (BUS) at the amino acid terminal. This segment is not present in the receptor-A.

Isoforms

As demonstrated in progesterone receptor-deficient mice, the physiological effects of progesterone depend completely on the presence of the human progesterone receptor (hPR), a member of the steroid-receptor superfamily of nuclear receptors. The single-copy human (hPR) gene uses separate promoters and translational start sites to produce two isoforms, hPR-A and -B, which are identical except for an additional 165 amino acids present only in the N terminus of hPR-B. Although hPR-B shares many important structural domains with hPR-A, they are in fact two functionally distinct transcription factors, mediating their own response genes and physiological effects with little overlap. Selective ablation of PR-A in a mouse model, resulting in exclusive production of PR-B, unexpectedly revealed that PR-B contributes to, rather than inhibits, epithelial cell proliferation both in response to estrogen alone and in the presence of progesterone and estrogen. These results suggest that in the uterus, the PR-A isoform is necessary to oppose estrogen-induced proliferation as well as PR-B-dependent proliferation.

Functional polymorphisms

Six variable sites, including four polymorphisms and five common haplotypes have been identified in the human PR gene . One promoter region polymorphism, +331G/A, creates a unique transcription start site. Biochemical assays showed that the +331G/A polymorphism increases transcription of the PR gene, favoring production of hPR-B in an Ishikawa endometrial cancer cell line.

Several studies have now shown no association between progesterone receptor gene +331G/A polymorphisms and breast or endometrial cancers.  However, these follow-up studies lacked the sample size and statistical power to make any definitive conclusions, due to the rarity of the +331A SNP. It is currently unknown which if any polymorphisms in this receptor are of significance to cancer. A study of 21 non-European populations identified two markers within the PROGINS haplotype of the PR gene as positively correlated with ovarian and breast cancer.

Animal studies

Development 

Knockout mice of the PR have been found to have severely impaired lobuloalveolar development of the mammary glands as well as delayed but otherwise normal mammary ductal development at puberty.

Behavior 
During rodent perinatal life, progesterone receptor (PR) is known to be transiently expressed in both the ventral tegmental area (VTA) and the medial prefrontal cortex (mPFC) of the mesocortical dopaminergic pathway. PR activity during this time period impacts the development of dopaminergic innervation of the mPFC from the VTA. If PR activity is altered, a change in dopaminergic innervation of the mPFC is seen and tyrosine hydroxylase (TH), the rate-limiting enzyme for dopamine synthesis, in the VTA will also be impacted. TH expression in this area is an indicator of dopaminergic activity, which is believed to be involved in normal and critical development of complex cognitive behaviors that are mediated by the mesocortical dopaminergic pathway, such as working memory, attention, behavioral inhibition, and cognitive flexibility.

Research has shown that when a PR antagonist, such as RU 486, is administered to rats during the neonatal period, decreased tyrosine hydroxylase immunoreactive (TH-ir) cells density, a strong co-expresser with PR-immunoreactivity (PR-ir), is seen in the mPFC of juvenile rodents. Later on, in adulthood, decreased levels of TH-ir in the VTA are also shown. This alteration in TH-ir fiber expression, an indicator of altered dopaminergic activity resulting from neonatal PR antagonist administration, has been shown to impair later performance on tasks that measure behavioral inhibition and impulsivity, as well as cognitive flexibility in adulthood. Similar cognitive flexibility impairments were also seen in PR knockout mice as a result of reduced dopaminergic activity in the VTA.

Conversely, when a PR agonist, such as 17α-hydroxyprogesterone caproate, is administered to rodents during perinatal life, as the mesocortical dopaminergic pathway is developing, dopaminergic innervation of the mPFC increases. As a result, TH-ir fiber density also increases. Interestingly, this increase in TH-ir fibers and dopaminergic activity is also linked to impaired cognitive flexibility with increased perseveration later on in life.

In combination, these findings suggest that PR expression during early development impact later cognitive functioning in rodents. Furthermore, it appears as though abnormal levels of PR activity during this critical period of mesocortical dopaminergic pathway development may have profound effects on specific behavioral neural circuits involved in the formation of later complex cognitive behavior.

Ligands

Agonists
 Endogenous progestogens (e.g., progesterone)
 Synthetic progestogens (e.g., norethisterone, levonorgestrel, medroxyprogesterone acetate, megestrol acetate, dydrogesterone, drospirenone)

Mixed
 Selective progesterone receptor modulators (e.g., ulipristal acetate, telapristone acetate, vilaprisan, asoprisnil, asoprisnil ecamate)

Antagonists
 Antiprogestogens (e.g., mifepristone, aglepristone, onapristone, lonaprisan, lilopristone, toripristone)

Interactions 

Progesterone receptor has been shown to interact with:
 KLF9,
 Nuclear receptor co-repressor 2, and
 UBE3A.

See also 
 Membrane progesterone receptor
 Selective progesterone receptor modulator
 Phytoprogestogen

References

Further reading

External links 
 

Intracellular receptors
Progestogens
Transcription factors